Fabiana Andrea Granizal Martinez (born 1 August 1987) is an Uruguayan racing cyclist. She rode in the women's road race event at the 2019 UCI Road World Championships.

Major results

2006
 4th Road Race, South American Games
2018
 9th Road Race, Pan American Cycling Championships
2019
 8th Road Race, Pan American Cycling Championships
2021
 3rd National Road Race Championships
2022
 1st  National Time Trial Championships
 2nd National Road Race Championships
 3rd Road Race, Pan American Cycling Championships

References

External links

1987 births
Living people
Uruguayan female cyclists
Cyclists at the 2019 Pan American Games
Pan American Games competitors for Uruguay
21st-century Uruguayan women